Stephanie Noelle Scott (born December 6, 1996) is an American actress and singer. Scott began acting with the comedy film Beethoven's Big Break (2008), and thereafter released her debut extended play New Girl in Town (2009). This was followed by a supporting role in the romance film Flipped (2010), which won her a Young Artist Award. She played the role of Lexi Reed on Disney Channel's A.N.T. Farm (2011–2014), which won her a second Young Artist Award and introduced her to a wider audience. While on Disney, she recorded a number of Disney Channel promotional singles, which were released between 2008 and 2012. 

Scott made her foray into mainstream film and television with a voice role in the animated film Wreck-It Ralph (2012), for which she won a BTVA Award. She then played the leading role of Quinn Brenner in the horror film Insidious: Chapter 3 (2015)—her highest-grossing film—and co-starred in the musical film Jem and the Holograms (2015), for which she additionally contributed to its soundtrack. Her subsequent film roles have consisted of independent features, such as the neo-noir Small Town Crime (2017), the biopic Beautiful Boy (2018), the high-school drama Good Girls Get High (2018) and the thriller Mary (2019). She currently leads the Peacock original series The Girl in the Woods (2021–present).

Early life
Scott was born in Chicago, Illinois and has two older brothers. She lived in Indialantic, Florida and attended Holy Trinity Episcopal Academy, before becoming home schooled in 2010.

Career

2008–2012: Early work and Disney stardom 

Scott was first a California Discovery Girl in the 2009 August/September issue of Discovery Girls magazine. She appeared in the role of Katie in Beethoven's Big Break. She appeared in the feature film Flipped directed by Rob Reiner as well as in the film titled No Strings Attached where she played a young version of the main character. 

Scott was the voice of Emma on the Disney animated TV series Special Agent Oso premiering in April 2009 on Disney Channel. Scott had a guest-starring role in the Fox series Sons of Tucson as well as on NBC series Chuck playing the 12-year-old Sarah Walker. Scott released her second song entitled, "Shoulda Woulda Coulda".

In 2011 she starred in the Disney Channel Original Series A.N.T. Farm as one of the main characters, Lexi Reed. She also served as second assistant director in the show's first season. Scott released a song entitled, "Girl I Used to Know" in the same year. The official music video for the song premiered on October 26, the music video features an appearance by Orlando based band Before You Exit portraying as her band.

2013–present: Mainstream film and television 
In 2013 Scott was a guest star on the fifteenth season of Law & Order: Special Victims Unit as Clare Wilson. Scott provided the voice of Moppet Girl in Wreck-It Ralph. Scott also guest-starred on the Disney Channel show Jessie, as Maybelle. From 2013, Scott has sponsored girls through Shoeboxes for Haiti, and is a cookie ambassador with the organization Cookies for Kids Cancer.

In 2014, Scott began to film four films, Insidious: Chapter 3 (released in June 2015), Jem and the Holograms, 1 Mile to You, and Caught. Caught was screened at the premiere of the 2015 Los Angeles Film Festival on June 12, 2015. Also in 2015, Scott appeared in Hayley Kiyoko's music video for "Girls Like Girls". In 2015, Scott appeared as the daughter of Pierce Brosnan and Anna Friel, in crime thriller film I.T. (2016), directed by John Moore. 

In August 2016, it was announced that Scott would play the lead role in the independent sci-fi feature film At First Light (2018), directed by Jason Stone. In February 2021, Scott appeared as the main character Sara Cody in the Lifetime movie Girl In The Basement, based on the infamous Fritzl kidnapping case. In May 2021, she played the lead as Warrior Carrie in the Crypt TV supernatural drama series The Girl in the Woods.

Filmography

Film

Television

Music videos

Discography

Extended plays

Singles

Promotional singles

Other appearances

Music videos

Awards and nominations

References

External links

 
 

1996 births
Living people
21st-century American actresses
Actresses from Chicago
Actresses from Florida
American film actresses
American television actresses
Holy Trinity Episcopal Academy alumni
People from Indialantic, Florida
21st-century American singers
21st-century American women singers